Omega Alamadine Roberts (born 12 December 1989) is a Liberian footballer who plays as a centre back.

Career

Club

Early career
During his time at Gedi & Sons FC, a youthful club he helped to reach the promotion into the 2006 Liberian Premier League. His good displays along with the national team call, made him earn a move to Ivory Coast in early 2007 to play with Séwé Sports de San Pedro with whom he played in the 2007 CAF Champions League. After that season he moved to Cameroon in 2009 where he played with Tiko United being one of the most important players for the club in their historical achievement of winning the 2009 Cameroon Première Division. After that impressive season he played with Diables Noirs in the Republic of Congo in 2009 where, along with one national title, he also won the title of the best foreign player of the league. At end of 2009 he moved to Malian Club Olympique de Bamako where he played two seasons until 2011. During this period in Mali, he was nicknames as the "Liberian Rio Ferdinand", due to his playing intelligence, technique, composure and physical structure. While playing with COB along his national teammate Melvin Kicmett, he won the Top Four Trophy in 2009 and the Malian Cup in 2011, along with another top continental competition presence by playing in the 2010 CAF Confederation Cup.

Sloboda Užice
In early August 2011 he arrived to Serbia to be on trial with FK Sloboda Užice ending up signing a definitive contract with the club on 24 August. this way achieving his longtime desire to achieve a move to Europe. His debut in official matches was on 21 September 2011, in a 2011–12 Serbian Cup match against FK Teleoptik, and his league debut was 3 days later, on 24 September, as a starter in a match of the round 6 against Javor.

Smederevo
In July 2012, Roberts moved to another Serbian SuperLiga side FK Smederevo on a free transfer. He made his competitive debut in the first round of the Serbian SuperLiga against FK Vojvodina in Novi Sad. He received a red card in the 69th minute. The match finished 0–0.

Red Star Belgrade
After terminating his contract with Smederevo, Omega joined Red Star Belgrade in June 2013. He made his competitive debut for Red Star on 25 September 2013, in a 3–0 victory away against FK Proleter Novi Sad in the Serbian Cup.

Donji Srem
After spells with FK Mladost Podgorica in the Montenegrin First League and FK Borac Čačak in Serbian SuperLiga, Omega joined Serbian First League side FK Donji Srem at the start of the 2015–16 season.

AZAL
Roberts went on trial with Azerbaijan Premier League team AZAL PFK in January 2017. He ended up joining the club.

International
He is also a member of the Liberia national football team. He made his international debut for his country in 2006, while only 16 years of age. He also played on the senior level in the 2008 Nations Cup qualifiers when a depleted Lone Star squad lost away to Equatorial Guinea 2–1.

In summer 2012, after a half season in Serbia where he was a regular with Sloboda, he received a new call and played on 10 June against Angola for the 2014 FIFA World Cup qualifications. A week afterwards he played against Namibia for the 2013 Africa Cup of Nations qualifications. He scored his first goal for the national team on 8 September 2012 against Nigeria.

Career statistics

International

Statistics accurate as of match played 29 March 2016

International goals

Honours
Tiko United
Cameroon Première Division: 2008–09
Diables Noirs
Congo Premier League: 2009
Olympique Bamako
Malien Cup: 2011
Red Star Belgrade
Serbian SuperLiga: 2013–14
OFK Titograd
Montenegrin Cup runner-up: 2014
Individual
Best foreign player of the Congo Premier League: 2009

References

External links

 Alamadine Omega at Srbijafudbal

1983 births
Living people
Sportspeople from Monrovia
Liberian footballers
Liberia international footballers
Liberian expatriate footballers
Association football defenders
Séwé Sport de San-Pédro players
Tiko United players
CO de Bamako players
FK Sloboda Užice players
OFK Žarkovo players
FK Smederevo players
Red Star Belgrade footballers
FK Borac Čačak players
OFK Titograd players
FK Donji Srem players
FK Budućnost Dobanovci players
AZAL PFK players
Montenegrin First League players
Serbian First League players
Serbian SuperLiga players
Azerbaijan Premier League players
Liberian expatriate sportspeople in Ivory Coast
Liberian expatriate sportspeople in Cameroon
Liberian expatriate sportspeople in Mali
Liberian expatriate sportspeople in Azerbaijan
Expatriate footballers in Ivory Coast
Expatriate footballers in the Republic of the Congo
Expatriate footballers in Cameroon
Expatriate footballers in Mali
Expatriate footballers in Serbia
Expatriate footballers in Montenegro
Expatriate footballers in Azerbaijan